Jorge da Rocha (born 17 September 1945) is a Brazilian equestrian. He competed in the individual dressage event at the 2000 Summer Olympics.

References

1945 births
Living people
Brazilian male equestrians
Brazilian dressage riders
Olympic equestrians of Brazil
Equestrians at the 2000 Summer Olympics
Sportspeople from Rio de Janeiro (city)